Trephionus bifidilobatus, is a species of beetle belonging to the family Carabidae. It is endemic to Japan.

Etymology
The specific name bifidilobatus is due to bifid apex of the dorso-apical lobe.

Description
Body length of male is about 8.2 mm. Head and pronotum black. Elytra reddish brown. Endophallus stout in shape. No hind wings. Dorso-apical lobe bifid at apex. Apex of aedeagus truncate.

References

Beetles described in 2018
Platyninae